Lisa Ervin (born April 20, 1977) is an American former figure skater. She won three consecutive silver medals at the World Junior Figure Skating Championships from 1991 to 1993 and is the 1993 US National silver medalist. She was coached by Carol Heiss Jenkins and originally trained by Melissa Smith at the Charleston Civic Center Ice Arena. Due to an eating disorder, she chose to retire from competitive skating. Her decision to stop skating is profiled in Christine Brennan's book Inside Edge: A Revealing Journey into the Secret World of Figure Skating.

Ervin currently works as a coach and technical specialist. She served as the technical specialist during the ladies event at the 2007–2008 ISU Junior Grand Prix event in Lake Placid, New York and during the ladies event at the 2006 Cup of China. She was the Assistant Technical Specialist at the men's event at the 2008 European Figure Skating Championships, and the men's event at the 2006 Cup of China.

She coaches in New York state.
She divorced in 2012.

She is currently coaching and is technical specialist for the IJS (International Judging System).  She is also working with children who have special needs.
She recently went back to school to become a teacher.

Competitive highlights

References

1977 births
Living people
American female single skaters
International Skating Union technical specialists
World Junior Figure Skating Championships medalists
21st-century American women
20th-century American women